Patna Central was an Assembly constituency in Bihar which existed till 2008. It came under Patna Lok Sabha constituency. From 2008 the seat was succeeded by Kumhrar Assembly constituency. Arun Kumar Sinha was the last MLA from this constituency.

Members of Legislative Assembly

Election results

Oct 2005 Vidhan  Sabha

See also 

 Patna East Assembly constituency
 Patna West Assembly constituency

References 

Former assembly constituencies of Bihar
Bihar